John Courtenay may refer to:

 John Courtenay (of Tremere) ( – 1560), MP for Lostwithiel, Bodmin and Penryn in the United Kingdom
 John Courtenay, 15th Earl of Devon ( – 1471)
 John Courtenay (1738–1816), Member of Parliament for Tamworth and Appleby in the United Kingdom 
 John Courtenay Trewin (1908–1990), English journalist and writer

See also
John Courtney (disambiguation)
Jon Courtenay Grimwood, British science fiction writer